Herbert Wiltschnig (born 21 November 1975) is a former professional tennis player from Austria.

Biography
Wiltschnig, a right-handed player from Klagenfurt, featured in the boys' events at the French Open and Wimbledon in 1992. He turned professional in 1995.

Amongst his main draw appearances on the ATP Tour was the 1996 Italian Open, a top-tier event, now known as the Rome Masters. He also competed in seven editions of the Austrian Open Kitzbühel. As a doubles player he won Challenger titles in Brașov and Curitiba. As a veteran on the tennis circuit he played his last Futures tournament in 2011, on the verge of his 36th birthday.

Challenger titles

Doubles: (2)

References

External links
 
 

1975 births
Living people
Austrian male tennis players
Sportspeople from Klagenfurt